DJ Blakey (born 1985) is a DJ from London, England. He won the UK DMC final in 2004.

Career
Between 2004 and 2007, he hosted a weekly show on BBC 1Xtra.

He has held a residency at Fabric, London.

In 2007 he supported Jurassic 5 throughout their entire UK tour, and has also supported Nas in 2007 at the Bristol Academy, and Jay-Z in 2004 at the Prince's Trust Urban Music Festival.

He was employed by FreeStyleGames, a subsidiary of Activision, where he was working closely on the video game DJ Hero.

Trivia
He contributed the first ever "Mini Mix" on Annie Mac's BBC Radio 1 show, days before competing in the 2004 DMC World Final.
In 2001 at the UK ITF Final at Cargo nightclub in Shoreditch, London, he was asked to fill the place of a non showing DJ, as he had a bag of records with him. He placed 3rd.

Discography

Singles

If You See Me / Back Then (Slime Recordings) (Summer 2012)

British DJs
Living people
1985 births
BBC Radio 1Xtra presenters
Place of birth missing (living people)
DJs from London